Mychal Mulder (born June 14, 1994) is a Canadian professional basketball player for the Sioux Falls Skyforce of the NBA G League. He played college basketball for Vincennes University and the Kentucky Wildcats.

Early life
Mulder was adopted by parents Randy Mulder and Jennifer Gignac at three months old. His father worked at General Motors before being forced to retire after a leg injury. His father named him after former NBA player Mychal Thompson, the father of Mulder's future Golden State teammate Klay Thompson. Mulder was raised in Windsor, Ontario, alongside an elder adopted sister, Cynthia. He played basketball at Catholic Central High School, where he was coached by Pete Cusumano. Mulder was considered a Top 10 Canadian prospect in 2013.

College career
Mulder received a single NCAA Division I scholarship offer, to play for the Detroit Mercy Titans men's basketball team. Mulder opted to begin his college basketball career at Vincennes University.  As a sophomore, he averaged 15.7 points and 6.4 rebounds per game, shooting 46.3 percent from behind the arc. He led the team to a 33–2 record, was named a JUCO All-American and was rated the 13th-best junior-college prospect by 247Sports. 

He then transferred to play for the Kentucky Wildcats men's basketball team. He chose Kentucky over several other colleges, including Creighton, Indiana, and Wichita State. As a senior at Kentucky, Mulder made two starts and averaged 4.7 points and 1.5 rebounds in 10.6 minutes per game, shooting 40.3% from the field and a team-high 92.3% from the free throw line.

Professional career

Windy City Bulls (2017–2019)
Mulder went undrafted in the 2017 NBA Draft. He was later selected ninth overall in the 2017 NBA G League draft by the Windy City Bulls. In his second season with the Bulls, Mulder posted 13.7 points, 4.1 rebounds, 1.6 assists in 32.9 minutes per game. In May 2019, Mulder was invited to the NBA G League Elite Camp.

Sioux Falls Skyforce (2019–2020)
Mulder signed with the Miami Heat on September 17, 2019. The team waived Mulder on October 15, 2019. He began the season with the Sioux Falls Skyforce.

Golden State Warriors (2020–2021)
On February 27, 2020, the Golden State Warriors announced that they had signed Mulder to a 10-day contract. He made his debut against the Los Angeles Lakers that same day. Mulder had two points and four rebounds in that game, which was a 116–86 loss. 

On March 1, 2020, Mulder had a career-high 17 points, along with two rebounds, one assist, one block and one steal in just his third game with the Warriors, a 124–110 loss against the Washington Wizards. On March 7, he started against the Philadelphia 76ers - setting a new career-high 18 points and 3 assists during his last game of his first 10-day contract, a 118-114 win. On March 10, after his 10-day contract expired, the Warriors signed him to a multi-year contract.

On April 28, 2021, Mulder had a career-high 26 points and five rebounds in a 133-103 loss against the Dallas Mavericks.  On May 6, 2021, Mulder had 25 points in 20 minutes in a 118-97 win against the Oklahoma City Thunder. On May 14, 2021, Mulder started for the Warriors and had a new career-high of 28 points in a 125-122 win against the New Orleans Pelicans. 

Mulder was waived near the end of training camp before the 2021–22 season.

Orlando Magic (2021–2022)
On October 26, 2021, the Orlando Magic signed Mulder to a two-way contract. On January 6, 2022, he was waived.

Return to Sioux Falls (2022)
On March 3, 2022, Mulder signed with the Sioux Falls Skyforce.

Miami Heat (2022)
On March 24, 2022, Mulder signed a two-way contract with the Miami Heat. On July 16, he was waived. On October 9, 2022, Mulder was re-signed by the Heat.

Third stint with Skyforce (2022–present)
On October 24, 2022, Mulder rejoined the Sioux Falls Skyforce roster for training camp.

Career statistics

NBA

Regular season

|-
| style="text-align:left;"|
| style="text-align:left;"|Golden State
| 7 || 3 || 29.1 || .388 || .308 || .750 || 3.3 || 1.1 || .3 || .1 || 11.0
|-
| style="text-align:left;"|
| style="text-align:left;"|Golden State
| 60 || 6 || 12.8 || .449 || .397 || .636 || 1.0 || .4 || .2 || .2 || 5.6
|-
| rowspan=2 style="text-align:left;"|
| style="text-align:left;"|Orlando
| 15 || 2 || 13.0 || .299 || .283 || 1.000 || 1.4 || .2 || .3 || .1 || 3.7
|-
| style="text-align:left;"|Miami
| 2 || 1 || 22.0 || .400 || .500 || 1.000 || 1.5 || 1.0 || .0 || .5 || 7.0
|- class="sortbottom"
| style="text-align:center;" colspan="2"|Career
| 84 || 12 || 14.4 || .413 || .369 || .711 || 1.3 || .5 || .2 || .2 || 5.8

References

External links
Kentucky Wildcats bio

1994 births
Living people
Basketball players from Toronto
Canadian expatriate basketball people in the United States
Canadian men's basketball players
Golden State Warriors players
Kentucky Wildcats men's basketball players
Lakeland Magic players
Miami Heat players
National Basketball Association players from Canada
Orlando Magic players
Shooting guards
Sioux Falls Skyforce players
Sportspeople from Etobicoke
Undrafted National Basketball Association players
Vincennes Trailblazers men's basketball players
Windy City Bulls players